Matt Hazel (born January 23, 1992) is an American football wide receiver for the Lazio Ducks of the Italian Football League. He played college football at Coastal Carolina University. He was drafted by the Miami Dolphins in the sixth round of the 2014 NFL Draft.

High school career
A native of North Augusta, South Carolina, Hazel attended North Augusta High School where he recorded 75 catches, 1,193 receiving yards, and 18 touchdowns as a senior while leading North Augusta to the second round of the playoffs.

He was rated a two-star recruit by Rivals.com.

College career
Hazel attended Coastal Carolina University from 2010 to 2013, where he was a member of the Coastal Carolina Chanticleers football team. As a true freshman in 2010, he played 11 games (three starts) and caught 20 balls for 276 yards and five touchdowns. In 2011, he started 9 of 11 games, with 32 catches for 488 yards and six touchdowns. He started all 13 games in 2012 and posted 61 catches for 799 yards and eight touchdowns, and was named a first-team All-Big South selection. He started all 14 games in 2013, producing 70 catches for 990 yards and nine touchdowns, earning first-team All-Big South honors for the second year in a row.

He set several Coastal Carolina career and single-season records. His 183 career receptions, and 70 receptions in 2013, are both CCU records. His 2,553 career receiving yards and 28 career receiving touchdowns are both second in CCU history. He was the third player in school history to participate in the East-West Shrine Game,  joining Jerome Simpson and Josh Norman.

Professional career

Miami Dolphins
Hazel was drafted by the Miami Dolphins in the sixth round (190th overall) of the 2014 NFL Draft. He was waived by the Dolphins on August 30, 2014 and was signed to the practice squad the next day. He was promoted to the active roster on December 20, 2014.

On August 27, 2016, Hazel was waived by the Dolphins.

Buffalo Bills
On September 5, 2016, Hazel was signed to the Buffalo Bills' practice squad. He was released by the team on October 4, 2016.

Washington Redskins
On October 25, 2016, Hazel was signed to the Washington Redskins' practice squad. He signed a futures contract with the Redskins on January 2, 2017.

On September 2, 2017, Hazel was waived by the Redskins.

Indianapolis Colts
Hazel was claimed off waivers by the Indianapolis Colts on September 3, 2017. He was waived on September 16, 2017 but was re-signed two days later. He was waived again on September 25, 2017 and re-signed to the practice squad. He was promoted back to the active roster on November 9, 2017. He was waived again on November 28, 2017 and re-signed to the practice squad on December 11.

Cleveland Browns
On December 13, 2017, Hazel was signed by the Cleveland Browns off the Colts' practice squad.

On April 16, 2018, Hazel signed his restricted free-agent tender with the Browns for the 2018 season.

Hazel was waived by the Browns on April 30, 2018.

Indianapolis Colts (second stint)
On August 12, 2018, Hazel was signed by the Indianapolis Colts. He was waived/injured on August 23, 2018 and placed on injured reserve. He was released on September 11, 2018.

Winnipeg Blue Bombers
On May 21, 2019, Hazel signed with the Winnipeg Blue Bombers of the Canadian Football League.

Lazio Ducks

In 2021, Hazel signed with the Lazio Ducks of the Italian Football League in Rome, Italy. 
Hazel had 67 receptions for 977 yards and 10 touchdowns on the season for the Ducks. 
Hazel resigned with the Ducks for the 2022 season.

References

External links
Coastal Carolina Chanticleers bio

1992 births
Living people
African-American players of American football
American football wide receivers
Buffalo Bills players
Cleveland Browns players
Coastal Carolina Chanticleers football players
Indianapolis Colts players
Miami Dolphins players
People from North Augusta, South Carolina
Players of American football from South Carolina
Washington Redskins players
21st-century African-American sportspeople
American expatriate players of American football
American expatriate sportspeople in Italy